Pterotyphis eos paupereques is a subspecies of small predatory sea snail, a marine gastropod mollusc in the family Muricidae, the murex snails or rock snails.

References

 

Muricidae
Gastropods of New Zealand